Jakub Tronina (born December 16, 1996) is a Polish male acrobatic gymnast. With Iga Klesyk, he competed in the 2014 Acrobatic Gymnastics World Championships.

Tronina is married to Kamila Krupa, a Polish show dancer.

References 

1996 births
Living people
Polish acrobatic gymnasts
Male acrobatic gymnasts
Place of birth missing (living people)